Yarigu Helbedi (transl. Don't Tell Anyone) is a 1994 Kannada comedy-drama film directed by Kodlu Ramakrishna. It stars Anant Nag, Vinaya Prasad, Mukhyamantri Chandru and Vaishali Kasaravalli among others. The movie has become a cult film among Kannada film viewers. The movie was remade in Tulu in 2015 by the same director as Eregla Panodchi.

Plot
Govinda (Anant Nag) is a con artist who is always on the lookout for gullible people in order to extract money or some form of benefit from them. Govinda is in love with Champa (Vanitha Vasu) whom he intends to marry much to the dissatisfaction of Champa's father (Shivaram) who considers Govinda as a no good fellow loafing around and without a job.

Sarojamma (Vinaya Prasad), Subbamma (Satyabhama), Jalajamma (Vaishali Kasaravalli) and Susheelamma (Girija Lokesh) are very close friends and neighbours who live in the same housing complex owned by Obaliah (Mukhyamantri Chandru). Jalajamma's husband lives and works in Dubai and visits her once in a year. The ladies always get together in the common place in the housing complex and share about their lives and gossip. Sarojamma's husband Ramaraya (Lokesh), Susheelamma's husband Doddanna (Doddanna) are close friends who usually get together in a bar, drink and share their trouble in their lives. Sheela (Tara) also lives in the same apartment complex, but is always taunted by the other ladies as she is a widow. She lives with her young daughter. The neighbours even make up stories that she is a woman of bad character and has relationship with other men while this is absolutely untrue. They suspect Naveen (Ramakrishna) to be Sheela's lover, but he happens to be a decent gentleman and a good friend to Sheela.

The wives always dream of owing a home, but their husband's never approve of this citing insufficient funds or high interest rate on loans. Govinda takes advantage of this desperation and contacts the wives while their husband's are at work. He promises the ladies that if they keep this a secret and can arrange some money he will get them housing plots allotted. The wives fall victim to the scam and end up selling their jewellery, some sink into their life long savings and give giving all the money to Govinda. Meanwhile, Govinda uses this money to buy himself a plot of land and starts constructing a house.

One day, Ramaraya who happens to be passing by notices that Govinda is supervising housing construction and inquiries about the same. Govinda tells him that he is getting married and wants to have a home before that. Ramaraya volunteers to oversee the construction and provide insights to better the home to which Govinda agrees.

The husband's eventually come to know that their wives have been deceived by Govinda and all the money is gone. Sheela attempts suicide but survives. Naveen proposes to her and she agrees to marry him. On the day of Govinda's house warming ceremony, all the husband and wives go and confront Govinda. Govinda tries playing around but he is completely trapped when husbands reveal that they know everything. Ramaraya reveals that the reason why he volunteered to oversee Govinda's house construction and was so helpful because, he was completely aware that Govinda by mistake is constructing house on the plot which Ramaraya has secretly purchased without his wife's knowledge. Co-incidentally it was the same plot which Govinda mistook for his plot and constructed the house.

Now Govinda is trapped because as per the Contractual documents, the plot belongs to Ramaraya and the constructed house too. Govinda in the end make amends and apologises. He is quickly forgiven and warned not to cheat in the future and to live a honest life.

Cast
 Anant Nag as Govinda
 Vinaya Prasad as Sarojamma
 Vanitha Vasu as Champa
 Mukhyamantri Chandru as Obaliah (Guest Appearance)
 Shivaram as Champa's father
 Satyabhama as Subbamma (Subbu)
 Vaishali Kasaravalli as Jalajamma
 Ramakrishna as Naveen (Guest Appearance)
 Doddanna as Doddanna
 Lokesh as Ramaraya
 Girija Lokesh as Susheelamma
 Tara as Sheela
Bangalore Nagesh as Sommanna (Guest Appearance)

References

External links
 
 Yarigu Helbedi (Kannada) - All Movie Database

1990s Kannada-language films
1994 films
Films scored by Rajan–Nagendra
Kannada films remade in other languages
Films directed by Kodlu Ramakrishna